Litaneutria ocularis is a species of praying mantis found in Mexico and the south-western United States (Texas).

References

Ocularis
Insects of Mexico
Insects of the United States
Mantodea of North America
Fauna of the Southwestern United States
Natural history of Texas
Insects described in 1892